Countrywide Farmers was a British agricultural retailer that went out of business in 2018.

The company developed from the amalgamation of a number of agricultural co-operatives such as West Midland Farmers' Association and Midland Shires Farmers. It was demutualised in 1999 when it became Countrywide Farmers plc. The chairman until 2004 was John Barnard Bush.

The new company was based in Evesham, Worcestershire and operated retail stores under the Countrywide brand, which sold equipment and supplies for small-scale agriculture and outdoor pursuits. After 14 unprofitable outlets had been sold in 2017, there were 48 stores when the company entered administration in 2018.

Many of the stores were closed while others were acquired by competitors, eight of them by Wynnstay.

References

External links

Agricultural cooperatives
Agriculture companies of the United Kingdom
British companies disestablished in 2018
Agriculture companies disestablished in 2018
2018 disestablishments in England
Retail companies disestablished in 2018
Retail companies of the United Kingdom